Brian James Fair (born May 30, 1975) is an American musician from Massachusetts, best known as lead vocalist of the metalcore band Shadows Fall. He graduated from Milford High School in 1993, and went on to study literature at Boston University.

History 
From a young age, Brian Fair had always been known for his affinity for a wide range of music. In seventh grade he had his first visit to a recording studio after he and two friends won a radio jingle contest (sponsored by Mass Electric) with a Beastie Boys-inspired tune "The Energy Conservation Rap Song." In high school, he played bass and sang in a punk band called Frenzy that performed at local underage shows.

Overcast 

In the summer of his sophomore year (August 1991), Fair co-founded Overcast, an influential hardcore band in the Worcester music scene. While Fair was on vocals, Scott McCooe and Pete Cortese played guitar, Mike D'Antonio played bass, and Jay Fitzgerald played drums. Overcast's first 7-inch, Bleed Into One, was released in 1992 through Exchange Records. The band's first full-length, Expectational Dilution, was released in 1994 and is considered a groundbreaking effort as many claim that Overcast are the pioneers of the metalcore scene. Their final full-length, Fight Ambition To Kill, was released in 1997. This release was followed by nationwide touring with Shai Hulud and Disembodied. Overcast eventually split up in November 1998.

Shadows Fall 

Soon after Overcast disbanded Fair joined Shadows Fall in place of Phil Labonte who left due to creative differences. Soon after the band signed to Century Media Records. The band recorded its second studio album Of One Blood with Fair on vocals in 2000, the release included re-recorded songs from Somber Eyes to the Sky.

Shadows Fall decided to change its style to find its own sound. Inspired by more thrash, hard rock and power ballad influences, the band recorded its third studio album, titled The Art of Balance. Released on September 17, 2002, the album peaked at number 15 on the Billboard Top Independent albums chart. Shadows Fall released three music videos to promote the album; "Thoughts Without Words", "Destroyer of Senses", and "The Idiot Box". The Art of Balance featured a cover of the Pink Floyd song "Welcome to the Machine". Andy Hinds of Allmusic stated the album is "a modern heavy metal album that is both brutal and highly musical, traditional yet forward-thinking", but criticized the placement of "Welcome to the Machine", stating the song "is stylishly well-executed, but seems a tad out of place nonetheless." Shadows Fall supported The Art of Balance by touring on Ozzfest in 2003.

Fair continued with Shadows Fall as his main priority, and the band released several more records. On April 29, 2006, Overcast reunited to play at the New England Metal and Hardcore Festival. The band then announced and re-recorded archive material and two new tracks, produced by metal producer  Nick Raskulinecz, under the name Reborn to Kill Again.

Shadows Fall's fifth record, Threads of Life, was released on April 3, 2007, through Atlantic Records and Roadrunner International. Fair has also recently worked with Necro, an underground hip hop musician and producer, on his album entitled Death Rap. Fair appears on Death Rap's fifth track, "Suffocated to Death by God's Shadow", with Mark Morton (Lamb of God), Mike Smith (Suffocation), and Steve DiGiorgio (Death).

The sixth studio album from Shadows Fall, titled Retribution, was released on September 15, 2009, and the seventh, titled Fire From the Sky, on May 15, 2012.

In December 2021, when asked by the Podioslave Podcast if there will be new music from Shadows Fall, Fair said, "We've talked about writing stuff, and there's a very definitive Shadows Fall approach to writing. So if Matt or Jon or Paul had ideas that really made sense, I'd see us pursuing 'em. But nothing right now. All we wanted to do is get through this show — we wanted to get through it, see if we could pull it off, see how it went. And now we're, like, 'Okay, now we can think about if we wanna do something else.' But nothing planned right now. I know Jon and Matt are riff machines — I'm sure they've got stuff — but they do also have other projects they're working on too… But right now we're just kind of recovering a little bit, trying to make sure I get my neck back in shape."

Other projects 
In January 2003, a new space rock project called Transient was formed. Transient saw Fair taking a break from vocals, this time playing the guitar and the drums instead. Fair was reunited with Overcast member Scott McCooe, who was now playing bass. Transient released a three song demo, whose tracks were recorded by Pete Rutcho of Blistered Earth, in November 2004. This is Transient's only material to date.

Death Ray Vision is an American hardcore punk band from Massachusetts, United States. The band includes members and former members of the bands Killswitch Engage, Shadows Fall, Cannae, Seemless, and Overcast.

The band released their first studio album titled We Ain't Leavin' Till You're Bleedin in 2013. The band also released an EP in 2011 titled Get Lost or Get Dead. In 2018 the band released a second LP titled Negative Mental Attitude.

Fair is currently singing with St. Louis hardcore band Hell Night, and works in the music industry as a rep for Alvarez Guitars, Dixon Drums, and a number of other instrument lines.

In 2018, Fair collaborated with Derek Kerswill, Matt LeBreton and Pete Gelles to form the band Downpour. In 2014, they released their first single "The Serpent's Tongue" followed by "Beautiful Nothing" in August 2017. Their debut album is set to release in September 2018.

 Personal life 
Fair is most known for his dreadlocks that have been known to be a large part of his stage show. He says he has kept them ever since making them when he was almost 16 years old. His locks are currently just shy of his six foot two frame, reaching down to his ankles and a couple inches from touching the ground; according to Fair they weigh over a pound. He uses them in a windmill fashion to whip fans during shows. He is also a proud fan of the Boston Celtics, wearing a jersey at many shows. Another commonality in his show is to stagedive, even though his locks frequently get pulled by fans. Fair says in an interview that he does get it caught and pulled by things often, including car doors, office chairs, light fixtures and guitar pedals.

He is a vegetarian.

 Discography 
 With Overcast 
Bleed Into One (7-inch) (1992)
Expectational Dilution (1994)
Stirring the Killer (7-inch) (1995)
Overcast/Arise Split CD (7-inch) (1996)
Begging for Indifference (7-inch EP/CD) (1996)
Fight Ambition to Kill"(1997)Reborn to Kill Again (2008)

 With Shadows Fall Of One Blood (2000)Deadworld (EP) (2001)Fear Will Drag You Down (Compilation Album) (2002)The Art of Balance (2002)The War Within (2004)Fallout from the War (Compilation Album) (2006)Threads of Life (2007)Seeking the Way: The Greatest Hits (2007)Retribution (2009)Fire From the Sky (2012)

 With Death Ray Vision We Ain't Leavin' Till You're Bleedin (2013)

 With Hell Night Human Shelves (2016)Hell Night Songs (2017)Cancercise (2017)Quarter Hour of Power Encapsulated Records compilation (2018)Split 7-inch EP with Sweat Shoppe (2018)Unlimited Destruction'' LP (2019)

References

Sources 
Overcast Musicmight

External links 

Shadows Fall official website
Death Ray Vision official website
Transient official website
Hell Night bandcamp

1975 births
American heavy metal singers
Boston University College of Arts and Sciences alumni
Living people
Musicians from Boston
Singers from Massachusetts
Shadows Fall members
21st-century American singers
21st-century American male singers